The Men's Open National is a team handball tournament to determine the Open National Champion from the US. This is the second highest level of competition in the United States. Not qualified teams for the Men's Elite Division are allowed to play in this Division. Before the Men's Elite Division was established, the National Champion was crowned at the Open Division.

The 2020 US Club Nationals were cancelled due to COVID-19 and, hence, no champion was designated.

Results

Division I

Division II

Individual Awards

Medal count

Men's Open I Medal count

Men's All time Medal count

Men's Open II Medal count

References

 Men's Open